Chowan Beach is an unincorporated community and census-designated place (CDP) in Chowan County, North Carolina, United States. It was first listed as a CDP in the 2020 census with a population of 385.

The community is in northern Chowan County, on the east bank of the tidal Chowan River. It is bordered to the north by Arrowhead Beach.

Demographics

2020 census

Note: the US Census treats Hispanic/Latino as an ethnic category. This table excludes Latinos from the racial categories and assigns them to a separate category. Hispanics/Latinos can be of any race.

References 

Census-designated places in Chowan County, North Carolina
Census-designated places in North Carolina